Crixás may refer to:

Crixás, Brazil, a municipality in northwestern Goiás state, Brazil.
Nova Crixás, a municipality in northeastern Goiás state, Brazil
Crixás do Tocantins, a municipality in the Brazilian state of Tocantins
Crixás River (disambiguation), several rivers in Brazil including
Crixás River (Goiás), a river of Goiás state in central Brazil
Crixás River (Tocantins), a river of Tocantins state in central Brazil
Crixás Açu River, a river of Goiás state in central Brazil
Crixás Mirim River, a river of Goiás state in central Brazil